Wallbank may refer to:
People
 Wallbank (surname)

Places
 Wallbank, Greater Manchester
 Wall Bank, Shropshire